This is a bibliography of the comic book writer Geoff Johns, who has been writing superhero comics for over twenty years.

DC Comics
Titles published by DC Comics include:
Stargirl:
DCU Heroes Secret Files & Origins: "Blue Valley High Yearbook" (with Lee Moder, one-page co-feature, 1999)
Stars and S.T.R.I.P.E. (with Lee Moder, Chris Weston (#0) and Scott Kolins (#9–11), 1999–2000) collected as:
 JSA Presents: Stars and S.T.R.I.P.E. Volume 1 (collects #1–8, tpb, 192 pages, 2007)
 JSA Presents: Stars and S.T.R.I.P.E. Volume 2 (collects #0 and 9–14, tpb, 192 pages, 2008)
Impulse #61: "The Sidekick Swap" (with Eric Battle and Mariko Shindo, 2000)
Infinite Frontier #0 (untitled 4-page story, with Todd Nauck, anthology, 2021) collected in Infinite Frontier (hc, 352 pages, 2022, ; tpb, 2023)
Stargirl Spring Break Special (with Todd Nauck and Bryan Hitch, 2021)
Stargirl: The Lost Children (with Todd Nauck, 2022-2023)
Justice Society of America:
Star Spangled Comics: "...A Terrifying Hour!" (with Chris Weston, one-shot, 1999) collected in The Justice Society Returns (tpb, 256 pages, 2003)
JSA (with the first half of the run — issues #6–25 and 32–51 — co-written by Johns and David S. Goyer, and the rest written by Johns solo; art by Marcos Martín (#6), Stephen Sadowski, Aldrin Aw (#11–12, 21, Annual), Steve Yeowell (#18), Rags Morales (#22, 26–27), Peter Snejbjerg (#29, 31–32), Keith Giffen (#33), Leonard Kirk, Patrick Gleason (#39), Sal Velluto (#46), Don Kramer, Sean Phillips (#59), Tom Mandrake (#60–62), Jerry Ordway (#63–64), Dave Gibbons (#67), David López (#76), Jim Fern (#77) and Dale Eaglesham (#81), 2000–2006) collected as:
 JSA by Geoff Johns Book One (includes #6–15, tpb, 392 pages, 2017)
 JSA by Geoff Johns Book Two (collects #16–25, tpb, 440 pages, 2018)
 Includes the "Sorrow Even More" short story (co-written by Johns and David S. Goyer, art by Phil Winslade) from Secret Origins of Super-Villains 80-Page Giant (anthology one-shot, 1999)
 Includes "The Day Before..." short story (co-written by Johns and David S. Goyer, art by Stephen Sadowski) from JLA/JSA Secret Files & Origins (one-shot, 2003)
 Includes the JLA/JSA: Virtue and Vice graphic novel (co-written by Johns and David S. Goyer, art by Carlos Pacheco, 96 pages, 2002)
 Includes the JSA: Our Worlds at War one-shot (written by Johns, art by Javier Saltares, 2001)
 JSA by Geoff Johns Book Three (collects #26–31 and Annual, tpb, 480 pages, 2019)
 Includes the "Breaking Storms" (co-written by Johns and David S. Goyer, art by Javier Saltares) and "Upping the Ante" (written by Johns, art by Derec Aucoin) short stories from JSA Secret Files & Origins #2 (2001)
 Includes the 8-issue spin-off limited series JSA: All-Stars (co-written by Johns and David S. Goyer, art by Sal Velluto, Phil Winslade, Barry Kitson, Mike McKone, Adam DeKraker, Stephen Sadowski and Dave Ross, 2003–2004)
 JSA by Geoff Johns Book Four (collects #32–45, tpb, 352 pages, 2020)
 JSA by Geoff Johns Book Five (collects #46–58 and Hawkman vol. 4 #23–25, tpb, 416 pages, 2023)
 JSA: Lost (collects #59–67, tpb, 208 pages, 2005)
 JSA: Black Vengeance (collects #68–75, tpb, 208 pages, 2006)
 JSA: Mixed Signals (includes #76–77 and 81, tpb, 144 pages, 2006)
 JSA Omnibus Volume 1 (includes #6–25, JLA/JSA Secret Files & Origins, JLA/JSA: Virtue and Vice and JSA: Our Worlds at War, hc, 1,224 pages, 2014)
 JSA Omnibus Volume 2 (collects #26–75, Annual, Hawkman vol. 4 #23–25 and JSA Secret Files & Origins #2, hc, 1,408 pages, 2014)
 JSA Omnibus Volume 3 (includes #76–77 and 81, hc, 1,248 pages, 2015)
JSA: Classified #1–4: "Power Trip" (with Amanda Conner, 2005) collected as Power Girl (tpb, 176 pages, 2006)
Justice Society of America vol. 3 (with Dale Eaglesham, Fernando Pasarin and Jerry Ordway; issues #10–22 are co-written by Johns and Alex Ross, 2007–2009) collected as:
 The Next Age (collects #1–4, hc, 144 pages, 2007, ; tpb, 2008)
 Justice League of America: The Lightning Saga (includes #5–6, hc, 224 pages, 2008, ; tpb, 2009)
 Thy Kingdom Come Volume 1 (collects #7–12, hc, 160 pages, 2008, ; tpb, 2009)
 Thy Kingdom Come Volume 2 (collects #13–18 and Annual, hc, 192 pages, 2008, ; tpb, 2009)
 Thy Kingdom Come Volume 3 (collects #19–22, hc, 224 pages, 2009, ; tpb, 2010)
 Includes the JSA Kingdom Come Special: The Kingdom (co-written by Johns and Alex Ross, art by Fernando Pasarin, 2009)
 Includes the "Secret Origin of Starman" (art by Scott Kolins) short story from JSA Kingdom Come Special: Magog (2009)
 Black Adam and Isis (collects #23–26, hc, 160 pages, 2009, ; tpb, 2010)
 JSA Omnibus Volume 3 (collects #1–26, Annual and JSA Kingdom Come Specials, hc, 1,248 pages, 2015)
The New Golden Age #1 (2022)
Justice Society of America vol. 4 (with Mikel Janín, 2022-present)
Green Lantern:
Day of Judgment (tpb, 160 pages, 2013) includes:
 Day of Judgment #1–5 (with Matthew Dow Smith and Christopher Jones (#3–5), 1999)
 Day of Judgment Secret Files & Origins: "Faust's Epilogue" (with Jason Orfalas, co-feature, 1999)
Green Lantern Secret Files & Origins #2: "Lost Pages: Haunting" (with Shawn Martinbrough, co-feature, 1999)
Green Lantern: Rebirth #1–6 (with Ethan Van Sciver, 2004–2005) collected as Green Lantern: Rebirth (hc, 176 pages, 2005, ; tpb, 2007)
Green Lantern (with Ethan Van Sciver, Carlos Pacheco, Simone Bianchi (vol. 4 #6), Ivan Reis, Daniel Acuña (vol. 4 #18–20), Dave Gibbons (co-features in vol. 4 #18–20), Mike McKone (vol. 4 #26–28), Philip Tan (vol. 4 #39–42), Rafael Albuquerque (co-feature in vol. 4 #40), Doug Mahnke, Ed Benes (vol. 4 #49 and 63), Jerry Ordway (co-feature in vol. 4 #49), Shawn Davis (co-feature in vol. 4 #55), Ardian Syaf (vol. 4 #63 and vol. 5 #18–19), Mike Choi (vol. 5 #6), Renato Guedes with Jim Calafiore (vol. 5 #12) and Szymon Kudranski (vol. 5 #18–19), 2005–2013) collected as:
 Green Lantern by Geoff Johns Book One (collects Rebirth #1–6 and vol. 4 #1–3, tpb, 400 pages, 2019)
 Includes the "Flight" (art by Darwyn Cooke) and "The Day Before" (art by Ethan Van Sciver) short stories from Green Lantern Secret Files & Origins 2005 (one-shot, 2005)
 Includes the 5-issue spin-off limited series Green Lantern Corps: Recharge (co-written by Johns and Dave Gibbons, art by Patrick Gleason, 2005–2006)
 Green Lantern by Geoff Johns Book Two (collects vol. 4 #4–20, tpb, 400 pages, 2019)
 Green Lantern by Geoff Johns Book Three (collects vol. 4 #21–25 and co-features from #18–20, tpb, 400 pages, 2020)
 Includes Green Lantern: Sinestro Corps Special (written by Johns, art by Ethan Van Sciver and Dave Gibbons, 2007)
 Includes the Tales of the Sinestro Corps: Superman-Prime one-shot (written by Johns, art by Pete Woods, 2007)
 Green Lantern by Geoff Johns Book Four (collects vol. 4 #26–38, tpb, 352 pages, 2020)
 Includes the Final Crisis: Rage of the Red Lanterns one-shot (written by Johns, art by Shane Davis, 2008)
 Green Lantern: Agent Orange (collects vol. 4 #39–42, hc, 128 pages, 2009, ; tpb, 2010)
 Blackest Night: Green Lantern (collects vol. 4 #43–52, hc, 272 pages, 2010, ; tpb, 2011)
 Blackest Night: Tales of the Corps (includes the co-feature from vol. 4 #49, hc, 176 pages, 2010, ; tpb, 2011)
 Includes short stories from the 3-issue spin-off limited series Blackest Night: Tales of the Corps (written by Johns, art by Jerry Ordway, Rags Morales, Eddy Barrows and Gene Ha, 2009)
 Green Lantern: Brightest Day (collects vol. 4 #53–62, hc, 272 pages, 2011, ; tpb, 2012)
 War of the Green Lanterns (includes vol. 4 #63–67, hc, 272 pages, 2011, ; tpb, 2012)
 Green Lantern: Sinestro (collects vol. 5 #1–6, hc, 160 pages, 2012, ; tpb, 2013)
 Green Lantern: The Revenge of Black Hand (collects vol. 5 #7–12 and Annual, hc, 192 pages, 2013, ; tpb, 2013)
 Green Lantern: The End (collects vol. 5 #0, 13–20, hc, 264 pages, 2013, ; tpb, 2014)
 Green Lantern by Geoff Johns Omnibus Volume 1 (collects vol. 4 #1–25, Rebirth #1–6, Recharge #1–5, Secret Files & Origins 2005, Sinestro Corps Special and Tales of the Sinestro Corps: Superman-Prime, hc, 1,232 pages, 2015)
 Green Lantern by Geoff Johns Omnibus Volume 2 (collects vol. 4 #26–52, Rage of the Red Lanterns, Blackest Night #0–8, Blackest Night: Tales of the Corps #1–3 and Untold Tales of Blackest Night, hc, 1,040 pages, 2015)
 Green Lantern by Geoff Johns Omnibus Volume 3 (collects vol. 4 #53–67, vol. 5 #0–20 and Annual, Larfleeze Christmas Special, hc, 1,104 pages, 2016)
Green Lantern: Larfleeze Christmas Special: "Aren't Orange You Glad It's Christmas?!" (with Brett Booth, one-shot, 2011)
Green Lantern: The Movie Prequels (tpb, 128 pages, 2011) includes:
 Green Lantern Movie Prequel: Hal Jordan (co-written by Johns and Greg Berlanti, art by Jerry Ordway, one-shot, 2011)
 Green Lantern Movie Prequel: Sinestro (co-written by Johns and Michael Goldenberg, art by Jerry Ordway, one-shot, 2011)
Green Lanterns: Rebirth (co-written by Johns and Sam Humphries, art by Ethan Van Sciver and Ed Benes, one-shot, 2016) collected in Green Lanterns: Rage Planet (tpb, 176 pages, 2017)
Green Lantern: 80th Anniversary 100-Page Super Spectacular: "Last Will" (with Ivan Reis, anthology one-shot, 2020)
Teen Titans:
Young Justice: Sins of Youth (tpb, 320 pages, 2000) includes:
 Sins of Youth: Starwoman and the JSA, Jr.: "Stars and Tykes" (with Drew Johnson, one-shot, 2000)
 Sins of Youth: Secret Files & Origins: "Crisis on Infantile Earths" (co-written by Johns and Ben Raab, art by Carlo Barberi, co-feature, 2000)
The Titans (co-written by Johns and Ben Raab):
 The Titans Annual: "The Way of the Warrior" (with Justiniano) and "Immortal Justice: The Legacy of Bushido" (with Rick Mays, 2000)
 The Titans Secret Files & Origins #2 (co-features, 2000):
 "Super Friends" (with Drew Johnson)
 "Shifting Gears" (with Georges Jeanty)
 "Who is Tara Markov?" (with Derec Aucoin)
Teen Titans vol. 3 (with Mike McKone, Tom Grummett (#7–8, 13–15, 20), Matthew Clark (#24–25), Tony Daniel, Todd Nauck (#31–33), Carlos Ferreira (#38), Peter Snejbjerg (#42) and Al Barrionuevo (#45–46), 2003–2007) collected as:
 Teen Titans by Geoff Johns Book One (collects #½, 1–12, tpb, 368 pages, 2017)
 Includes the "A Day After..." short story (co-written by Johns and Judd Winick, art by Carlo Barberi and Ivan Reis) from Teen Titans/Outsiders Secret Files (one-shot, 2003)
 Teen Titans by Geoff Johns Book Two (collects #13–19, tpb, 320 pages, 2018)
 Includes the "Passenger 15B" short story (co-written by Johns and Ben Raab, art by Justiniano) from Legends of the DC Universe 80-Page Giant #2 (anthology, 1999)
 Includes the 4-issue spin-off limited series Beast Boy (co-written by Johns and Ben Raab, art by Justiniano, 2000)
 Includes Teen Titans/Legion Special (co-written by Johns and Mark Waid, art by Joe Prado and Ivan Reis, 2004)
 Teen Titans by Geoff Johns Book Three (collects #20–26 and 29–31, tpb, 296 pages, 2019)
 Teen Titans: Life and Death (collects #29–33 and Annual, tpb, 208 pages, 2006)
 Issue #33 and Annual are scripted by Johns from plots by Marv Wolfman.
 Teen Titans: Titans Around the World (collects #34–41, tpb, 192 pages, 2007)
 Teen Titans: Titans East (collects #42–46, tpb, 144 pages, 2007)
 Issues #44–46 are scripted by Adam Beechen from Johns' plots.
 Teen Titans: Titans of Tomorrow (includes the short story from #50, tpb, 144 pages, 2008)
 Teen Titans by Geoff Johns Omnibus (collects #½, 1–26, 29–46, Annual, Beast Boy #1–4, Teen Titans/Legion Special and the short stories, hc, 1,440 pages, 2013)
The Flash:
The Flash vol. 2 (with Angel Unzueta, Scott Kolins, Rick Burchett (#189), Justiniano (#190, 219, ½), Phil Winslade (#196), Alberto Dose (#200–206), Howard Porter, Steven Cummings (#212) and Peter Snejbjerg (#218), 2000–2005) collected as:
 The Flash by Geoff Johns Book One (collects #164–176, tpb, 448 pages, 2015)
 Includes The Flash: Iron Heights one-shot (written by Johns, art by Ethan Van Sciver, 2001)
 The Flash by Geoff Johns Book Two (collects #177–188, tpb, 416 pages, 2016)
 Includes The Flash: Our Worlds at War one-shot (written by Johns, art by Angel Unzueta, 2001)
 Includes the "Rogues" short story (art by Scott Kolins) from The Flash Secret Files & Origins #3 (2001)
 Includes the DC First: Superman/The Flash one-shot (written by Johns, art by Rick Burchett, 2002)
 The Flash by Geoff Johns Book Three (collects #189–200, tpb, 350 pages, 2016)
 The Flash by Geoff Johns Book Four (collects #201–213, tpb, 320 pages, 2017)
 The Flash by Geoff Johns Book Five (collects #214–219, ½, 220–225, tpb, 336 pages, 2018)
 The Flash by Geoff Johns Omnibus Volume 1 (collects #164–191 and the one-shots, hc, 848 pages, 2019)
 The Flash by Geoff Johns Omnibus Volume 2 (collects #192–219, ½, 220–225, hc, 872 pages, 2021)
The Flash by Geoff Johns Book Six (tpb, 344 pages, 2019) collects:
 Final Crisis: Rogues' Revenge #1–3 (with Scott Kolins, 2008) also collected as Final Crisis: Rogues' Revenge (hc, 144 pages, 2009, ; tpb, 2010)
 The Flash: Rebirth #1–6 (with Ethan Van Sciver, 2009–2010) also collected as The Flash: Rebirth (hc, 168 pages, 2010, ; tpb, 2011)
 Blackest Night: The Flash #1–3 (with Scott Kolins, 2010) also collected in Blackest Night: Black Lantern Corps Volume 2 (hc, 240 pages, 2010, ; tpb, 2011)
The Flash vol. 3 (with Francis Manapul and Scott Kolins, 2010–2011) collected as:
 The Dastardly Death of the Rogues (collects #1–7, hc, 228 pages, 2011, ; tpb, 2012)
 Includes the "Running to the Past" short story (art by Scott Kolins) from The Flash Secret Files & Origins (one-shot, 2010)
 The Road to Flashpoint (collects #8–12, hc, 120 pages, 2011, ; tpb, 2012)
The Flash #750: "Beer Run" (with Scott Kolins, co-feature, 2020)
Silver Age: Showcase: "Showcase Presents the Seven Soldiers of Victory" (with Dick Giordano, one-shot, 2000)
Superman:
Superman: The Man of Steel:
 "Diamonds and Steel" (with Todd Nauck, in #121, 2002)
 "Lost Hearts, Part Three: Giving In" (with Tom Derenick, in #133, 2003)
Superman vol. 2:
 "What Can One Icon Do?" (scripted by Jeph Loeb from a story by Loeb and Johns, art by Ariel Olivetti, in #179, 2002)
 "The House of Dracula" (scripted by Jeph Loeb from a story by Loeb and Johns, art by Ian Churchill, in #180, 2002)
 Superman: Return to Krypton (tpb, 208 pages, 2004) includes:
 "Return to Krypton II, Part One: Rising Son" (with Pasqual Ferry, in #184, 2002)
 Superman: The Man of Steel — Believe (digest-sized tpb, 128 pages, 2013) includes:
 "The Second Landing" (with Brent Anderson, in #185, 2002)
 Superman: Ending Battle (tpb, 192 pages, 2009) includes:
 "Ending Battle" (with Pasqual Ferry, in #186–187, 2002)
 "Lost Hearts, Part One: Lost" (with Pasqual Ferry, in #189, 2003)
Superman/Batman Secret Files & Origins: "Recruits" (co-written by Johns and his brother Jeremy, art by Ivan Reis, co-feature, 2003) collected in Superman/Batman Omnibus Volume 1 (hc, 1,208 pages, 2020)
Superman Secret Files 2004: "Suicide Watch" (co-written by Johns and his brother Jeremy, art by Jim Fern, co-feature, 2004) collected in Superman: That Healing Touch (tpb, 168 pages, 2005)
Action Comics:
 Superman: Up, Up and Away! (tpb, 192 pages, 2006) collects:
 "Up, Up and Away! Parts One, Three, Five, Seven"  (co-written by Johns and Kurt Busiek, art by Pete Woods, in Superman #650–653, 2006)
 "Up, Up and Away! Parts Two, Four, Six, Eight" (co-written by Johns and Kurt Busiek, art by Pete Woods and Renato Guedes, in #837–840, 2006)
 Superman: Last Son (hc, 160 pages, 2008, ; tpb, 2009) collects:
 "Last Son" (co-written by Johns and Richard Donner, art by Adam Kubert, in #844–846, 851 and Annual #11, 2006–2008)
 Supergirl: Ghosts of Krypton (tpb, 304 pages, 2017) includes:
 "Family" (co-written by Johns, Kurt Busiek and Fabian Nicieza, art by Renato Guedes, in #850, 2006)
 Superman: Escape from Bizarro World (hc, 160 pages, 2008, ; tpb, 2009) collects:
 "Escape from Bizarro World" (co-written by Johns and Richard Donner, art by Eric Powell, in #855–857, 2007)
 Superman and the Legion of Super-Heroes (hc, 168 pages, 2008, ; tpb, 2009) collects:
 "Superman and the Legion of Super-Heroes" (with Gary Frank, in #858–863, 2008)
 "Batman and the Legion of Super-Heroes" (with Joe Prado, in #864, 2008)
 World's Finest (tpb, 144 pages, 2010) includes:
 "The Terrible Toyman" (with Jesús Merino, in #865, 2008)
 Superman: Brainiac (hc, 128 pages, 2009, ; tpb, 2010) collects:
 "Brainiac" (with Gary Frank, in #866–870, 2008)
 Superman: New Krypton Volume 1 (hc, 176 pages, 2009, ; tpb, 2010) includes:
 Superman: New Krypton Special (co-written by Johns, James Robinson and Sterling Gates, art by Gary Frank, Pete Woods and Renato Guedes, 2008)
 "New Krypton, Part Four: Beyond Doomsday" (with Pete Woods, in #871, 2009)
 Superman: New Krypton Volume 2 (hc, 160 pages, 2009, ; tpb, 2010) includes:
 "New Krypton, Part Seven: Brainiac Lives" (with Pete Woods, in #872, 2009)
 "New Krypton, Part Ten: Birth of a Nation" (with Pete Woods and Renato Guedes, in #873, 2009)
 Superman: New Krypton Volume 3 (hc, 144 pages, 2010, ; tpb, 2011) includes:
 Annual #10 (co-written by Johns and Richard Donner, art by Art Adams, Eric Wight, Joe Kubert, Phil Jimenez, Rags Morales, Tony Daniel and Gary Frank, 2007)
 Superman: Reign of Doomsday (hc, 200 pages, 2012, ; tpb, 2013) collects:
 "Friday Night in the 21st Century" (with Gary Frank, co-feature in #900, 2011)
 "The Car" (co-written by Johns and Richard Donner, art by Olivier Coipel, co-feature in #1000, 2018)
Superman: Secret Origin #1–6 (with Gary Frank, 2009–2010) collected as Superman: Secret Origin (hc, 224 pages, 2010, ; tpb, 2011)
Adventure Comics vol. 2 #0–3, 5–6: "Superboy" (with Francis Manapul, 2009–2010) collected as Superboy: The Boy of Steel (hc, 144 pages, 2010, ; tpb, 2011)
Superman vol. 3 #32–39: "The Men of Tomorrow" (with John Romita, Jr., 2014–2015) collected as Superman: The Men of Tomorrow (hc, 256 pages, 2015, ; tpb, 2016)
Hawkman vol. 4 (with Rags Morales, Ethan Van Sciver (#13), Don Kramer (#14), José Luis García-López (#18) and Scot Eaton (#19); issues #1–6 and 9–10 are co-written by Johns and James Robinson, 2002–2004) collected as:
Hawkman by Geoff Johns Book One (collects #1–14, tpb, 376 pages, 2017)
 Includes the "Hidden Past, Hidden Future" short story (art by Patrick Gleason) from Hawkman Secret Files & Origins (one-shot, 2002)
Hawkman by Geoff Johns Book Two (collects #15–25 and JSA #56–58, tpb, 344 pages, 2018)
Hawkman Omnibus Volume 1 (collects #1–25, JSA #56–58 and Hawkman Secret Files & Origins, hc, 688 pages, 2012)
9-11 Volume 2: "A Burning Hate" (co-written by Johns and David S. Goyer, art by Humberto Ramos, anthology graphic novel, 224 pages, 2002)
Batman:
Batman #606–607: "Death Wish for Two" (co-written by Johns and Ed Brubaker, art by Scott McDaniel, 2002) collected in Batman: Bruce Wayne — Fugitive (tpb, 432 pages, 2014)
Batman: Gotham Knights #49: "Fear is the Key" (with Tommy Castillo, co-feature, 2004) collected in Batman: Black and White Volume 3 (hc, 288 pages, 2007, ; tpb, 2008)
DC Comics Presents: Batman: "Batman of Two Worlds" (with Carmine Infantino, co-feature in one-shot, 2004)
All-Star Batgirl (with J. G. Jones, unreleased out-of-continuity limited series — initially announced for 2007)
Batman: Earth One (with Gary Frank, series of graphic novels set in an alternate universe and published under its own imprint):
 Volume 1 (hc, 144 pages, 2012, ; sc, 2014)
 Volume 2 (hc, 144 pages, 2015, ; sc, 2016)
 Volume 3 (hc, 160 pages, 2021)
 The Complete Collection (compilation of all three volumes — tpb, 464 pages, 2022)
Detective Comics #1000: "The Last Crime in Gotham" (with Kelley Jones, co-feature, 2019) collected in Batman: 80 Years of the Bat Family (tpb, 400 pages, 2020)
Batman: Three Jokers #1–3 (with Jason Fabok, DC Black Label, 2020) collected as Batman: Three Jokers (hc, 160 pages, 2020)
Eye of the Storm Annual: "Time to Kill" (with Jason Pearson, co-feature, Wildstorm, 2003) collected in Wildstorm: A Celebration of 25 Years (hc, 300 pages, 2017)
The Possessed #1–6 (co-written by Johns and Kris Grimminger, art by Liam Sharp, Cliffhanger, 2003) collected as The Possessed (tpb, 144 pages, 2004)
Tom Strong #25: "Tom Strong's Pal Wally Willoughby" (with John Paul Leon, America's Best Comics, 2004) collected in Tom Strong Book Four (hc, 160 pages, 2005, ; tpb, 2005)
Infinite Crisis Omnibus (hc, 1,152 pages, 2012) includes:
Countdown to Infinite Crisis (co-written by Johns, Judd Winick and Greg Rucka, art by Rags Morales, Ed Benes, Jesús Saiz, Ivan Reis and Phil Jimenez, one-shot, 2005)
JLA #115–119: "Crisis of Conscience" (co-written by Johns and Allan Heinberg, art by Chris Batista, 2005) also collected in JLA: The Deluxe Edition Volume 9 (tpb, 480 pages, 2017)
Infinite Crisis #1–7 (with Phil Jimenez, George Pérez, Ivan Reis and Jerry Ordway (#5–6), 2005–2006) also collected as Infinite Crisis (hc, 264 pages, 2006, ; tpb, 2008)
52 (co-written by Johns, Mark Waid, Greg Rucka and Grant Morrison, art by various artists from layouts by Keith Giffen, 2006–2007) collected as:
Volume 1 (collects #1–13, tpb, 304 pages, 2007)
Volume 2 (collects #14–26, tpb, 304 pages, 2007)
Volume 3 (collects #27–39, tpb, 304 pages, 2007)
Volume 4 (collects #40–52, tpb, 326 pages, 2007)
Omnibus (collects #1–52, hc, 1,216 pages, 2012)
Booster Gold vol. 2 (co-written by Johns and Jeff Katz, art by Dan Jurgens, 2007–2008) collected as:
52 Pick-Up (collects #1–6, hc, 160 pages, 2008, ; tpb, 2009)
Blue and Gold (collects #0, 7–10 and 1,000,000, hc, 160 pages, 2008, ; tpb, 2010)
Supernatural: Origins #1: "Speak No Evil" (with Phil Hester, co-feature, Wildstorm, 2007) collected in Supernatural: Origins (tpb, 144 pages, 2008)
DC Universe #0 (co-written by Johns and Grant Morrison; art by Ed Benes, George Pérez, Tony Daniel, Aaron Lopresti, Ivan Reis, Philip Tan, J. G. Jones, Doug Mahnke and Carlos Pacheco, one-shot, 2008)
Final Crisis: Legion of Three Worlds #1–5 (with George Pérez, 2008–2009) collected as Final Crisis: Legion of Three Worlds (hc, 176 pages, 2009, ; tpb, 2010)
Faces of Evil: Solomon Grundy: "The Curse!" (co-written by Johns and Scott Kolins, art by Kolins, one-shot, 2009) collected in Solomon Grundy (tpb, 192 pages, 2010)
Blackest Night Omnibus (hc, 1,664 pages, 2019) includes:
Blackest Night #0–8 (with Ivan Reis, 2009–2010) also collected as Blackest Night (hc, 304 pages, 2010, ; tpb, 2011)
The Atom and Hawkman #46 (with Ryan Sook, 2010) also collected in Blackest Night: Rise of the Black Lanterns (hc, 256 pages, 2010, ; tpb, 2011)
Untold Tales of Blackest Night: "Deleted Scenes from Blackest Night" (with Ivan Reis, two co-features in the one-shot, 2010)
Brightest Day (co-written by Johns and Peter Tomasi, art by Ivan Reis, Joe Prado, Patrick Gleason, Ardian Syaf and Scott Clark, 2010–2011) collected as:
Volume 1 (collects #0–7, hc, 256 pages, 2010, ; tpb, 2011)
Volume 2 (collects #8–16, hc, 240 pages, 2011, ; tpb, 2012)
Volume 3 (collects #17–24, hc, 224 pages, 2011, ; tpb, 2012)
Omnibus (collects #0–24, hc, 656 pages, 2014)
Wonder Woman #600: "The Sensational Wonder Woman" (with Scott Kolins, co-feature, 2010)
Flashpoint #1–5 (with Andy Kubert, 2011) collected as Flashpoint (hc, 176 pages, 2011, ; tpb, 2012)
Flashpoint Beyond #0-6 (with Tim Sheridan, Jeremy Adams, Eduardo Risso (issue #0), Xermánico, Mikel Janín, 2022) collected as Flashpoint Beyond (tpb, 2022)
Justice League of America:
Justice League vol. 2 (with Jim Lee, Gene Ha (#7, 20), Carlos D'Anda (#8), Ivan Reis, Tony Daniel (#13–14), Jesús Saiz (#18), Doug Mahnke, Scott Kolins (#34), Jason Fabok and Francis Manapul (#45–46), 2011–2016) collected as:
 Origin (collects #1–6, hc, 192 pages, 2012, ; tpb, 2013)
 The Villain's Journey (collects #7–12, hc, 176 pages, 2013, ; tpb, 2014)
 Throne of Atlantis (collects #13–17 and Aquaman vol. 5 #15–16, hc, 192 pages, 2013, ; tpb, 2014)
 The Grid (collects #18–20 and 22–23, hc, 176 pages, 2014, ; tpb, 2014)
 Forever Heroes (collects #24–29, hc, 168 pages, 2014, ; tpb, 2015)
 Injustice League (collects #30–39, hc, 256 pages, 2015, ; tpb, 2016)
 Darkseid War Volume 1 (collects the DC Sneak Peek: Justice League digital one-shot and #40–44, hc, 176 pages, 2016, ; tpb, 2016)
 Darkseid War Volume 2 (collects #45–50, hc, 200 pages, 2016, ; tpb, 2017)
 Includes Justice League: Darkseid War Special (written by Johns, art by Ivan Reis, Paul Pelletier and Oscar Jimenez, 2016)
 The New 52 Omnibus Volume 1 (includes #0–23 and Aquaman vol. 5 #14–16, hc, 1,248 pages, 2021)
 The New 52 Omnibus Volume 2 (collects #24–52, Forever Evil #1–7, the DC Sneak Peek: Justice League one-shot and Justice League: Darkseid War Special, hc, 1,256 pages, 2022)
Justice League International vol. 2 Annual: "Deleted" (co-written by Johns and Dan Didio, art by Jason Fabok, 2012) collected in Justice League International: Breakdown (tpb, 224 pages, 2013)
Justice League of America vol. 3 #1–7 (with David Finch, Brett Booth (#4–5) and Doug Mahnke (#6–7); issues #6–7 are co-written by Johns and Jeff Lemire, 2013)
 Collected as Justice League of America: World's Most Dangerous (hc, 224 pages, 2013, ; tpb, 2014)
 Collected in Justice League: The New 52 Omnibus Volume 1 (hc, 1,248 pages, 2021)
Aquaman:
Aquaman vol. 5 (with Ivan Reis, Pere Pérez with Pete Woods (#14) and Paul Pelletier, 2011–2013) collected as:
 The Trench (collects #1–6, hc, 144 pages, 2012, ; tpb, 2013)
 The Others (collects #7–13, hc, 160 pages, 2013, ; tpb, 2013)
 Throne of Atlantis (collects #0, 14–16 and Justice League vol. 2 #15–17, hc, 192 pages, 2013, ; tpb, 2014)
 Death of a King (collects #17–19 and 21–25, hc, 200 pages, 2014, ; tpb, 2014)
 Aquaman by Geoff Johns Omnibus (collects #0–19, 21–25 and Justice League vol. 2 #15–17, hc, 723 pages, 2018)
Aquaman: 80th Anniversary 100-Page Super Spectacular: "Father's Day" (with Paul Pelletier, anthology one-shot, 2021)
Captain Marvel:
Justice League vol. 2 #7–11, 0, 14–16, 18–21: "Shazam!" (with Gary Frank, co-feature, 2012–2013) collected as Shazam! (hc, 192 pages, 2013, ; tpb, 2014)
Shazam! vol. 2 #1–11, 13–14 (with Dale Eaglesham, Mayo Naito (#1, 3), Marco Santucci and Scott Kolins, 2019–2020) collected as Shazam and the Seven Magic Lands (tpb, 344 pages, 2020)
Ghosts: "Ghost-for-Hire" (with Jeff Lemire, anthology one-shot, Vertigo, 2012) collected in The Unexpected (tpb, 160 pages, 2013)
Masters of the Universe vol. 6 #1: "The Lost Knight" (with Howard Porter, digital anthology, 2012) collected in He-Man and the Masters of the Universe Volume 1 (tpb, 160 pages, 2013)
Justice League of America's Vibe #1–2 (co-written by Johns and Andrew Kreisberg, art by Pete Woods, 2013) collected in Justice League of America's Vibe: Breach (tpb, 232 pages, 2014)
Forever Evil #1–7 (with David Finch, 2013–2014) collected as Forever Evil (hc, 240 pages, 2014, ; tpb, 2015)
DC Universe: Rebirth: "The Clock is Ticking Across the DC Universe!" (with Gary Frank, Ethan Van Sciver, Ivan Reis and Phil Jimenez, one-shot, 2016)
Doomsday Clock (with Gary Frank, 2018–2020) collected as:
Part One (collects #1–6, hc, 224 pages, 2019)
Part Two (collects #7–12, hc, 232 pages, 2020)
The Complete Collection (collects #1–12, tpb, 456 pages, 2020)
The Absolute Edition (collects #1–12, hc, 496 pages, 2022)
Dark Nights: Death Metal — Secret Origin (co-written by Johns and Scott Snyder, art by various artists, one-shot, 2021) collected in Dark Nights: Death Metal — The Multiverse Who Laughs (tpb, 208 pages, 2021)
Flashpoint Beyond #0 (with Eduardo Risso) and 1–6 (co-written by Johns, Jeremy Adams and Tim Sheridan, art by Xermánico and Mikel Janín, 2022) collected as Flashpoint Beyond (tpb, 144 pages, 2022)

Marvel Comics
Titles published by Marvel include:
Morlocks #1–4 (with Shawn Martinbrough, 2002)
X-Men: Millennial Visions #2: "X-Men Reborn" (text for an illustration by Ethan Van Sciver, 2002)
Ultimate X-Men #½ (with Aaron Lopresti, 2002) collected in Ultimate X-Men Volume 6 (hc, 256 pages, 2006)
Icons: The Thing — Freakshow #1–4 (with Scott Kolins, 2002) collected as The Thing: Freakshow (tpb, 144 pages, 2005)
Icons: The Vision #1–4 (with Ivan Reis, 2002–2003) collected as The Vision: Yesterday and Tomorrow (tpb, 120 pages, 2005)
The Avengers vol. 3 (with Kieron Dwyer, Gary Frank (#61–62), Alan Davis (#63), Ivan Reis (#64), Olivier Coipel, Stephen Sadowski (#71, 76) and Scott Kolins, 2002–2004) colected as:
The Avengers by Geoff Johns: The Complete Collection Volume 1 (collects #57–63 and Icons: The Vision #1–4, tpb, 312 pages, 2013)
The Avengers by Geoff Johns: The Complete Collection Volume 2 (collects #64–76, tpb, 304 pages, 2013)

Image Comics
Titles published by Image include:
Noble Causes: Extended Family #1: "Tempter, Temper" (with Brent David McKee, anthology, 2003) collected in Noble Causes Archives Volume 2 (tpb, 598 pages, 2009)
Witchblade #67 (co-written by Johns and Kris Grimminger, art by Scott Benefiel, Top Cow, 2003) collected in Witchblade Compendium Volume 2 (tpb, 1,280 pages, 2008)
Tomb Raider: Scarface's Treasure (with Mark Texeira, one-shot, Top Cow, 2003)
Liberty Annual '10: "X-Rayz" (with Scott Kolins, anthology, 2010) collected in CBLDF Presents: Liberty (hc, 216 pages, 2014, ; tpb, 2016)
Unnamed Universe (series of interconnected titles published under Johns' own imprint, Mad Ghost Productions):
Geiger #1–6 (with Gary Frank, 2021) collected as Geiger Volume 1 (tpb, 160 pages, 2021)
Geiger 80-Page Giant: "Who is Redcoat?" (with Bryan Hitch) — "Where'd He Find Barney?" (with Gary Frank) — "Tales of the Unknown War" (with Paul Pelletier, anthology one-shot, 2022)
 Also includes a number of stories from various other creators:
 "The Safari" (written by Peter Tomasi, drawn by Peter Snejbjerg)
 "The Karloff" (written by Sterling Gates, drawn by Kelley Jones)
 "Nero's" (written by Leon Hendrix III, drawn by Staz Johnson)
 "Goldbeard's" (written by Pornsak Pichetshote, drawn by Sean Galloway)
 "The Manhattan" (written by Janet Harvey-Nevala, drawn by Megan Levens)
 "Saturn 7" (written by Jay Faerber, drawn by Joe Prado)
Junkyard Joe #1–6 (with Gary Frank, 2022–2023)
Image! #1–12: "The Blizzard" (with Andrea Mutti, anthology, 2022–2023)

Other publishers
Titles published by various publishers around the world include:
Humanoids Publishing:
Métal Hurlant vol. 2 #2: "Red Light" (with Christian Gossett, anthology, 2002)
 Collected in Métal Hurlant Volume 1 (hc, 192 pages, 2011)
 Collected in Métal Hurlant: Selected Works (tpb, 240 pages, 2020)
Olympus (co-written by Johns and Kris Grimminger, art by Butch Guice, graphic novel, sc, 112 pages, 2005, ; hc, 2015)
Aspen MLT:
Ekos Preview (with Michael Turner, 2003)
Michael Turner Presents: Aspen #1–3 (with Michael Turner, 2003)
More Fund Comics: An All-Star Benefit Comic for the CBLDF: "Workin' the Beach" (with Scott Kolins, anthology graphic novel, 144 pages, Sky Dog, 2003)
Dark Horse:
B.P.R.D.: Night Train (with Scott Kolins, one-shot, 2003) collected in B.P.R.D.: The Soul of Venice and Other Stories (tpb, 128 pages, 2004)
Black Hammer: Visions #2 (with Scott Kolins, anthology, 2021) collected in Black Hammer: Visions Volume 1 (hc, 112 pages, 2021)

References

External links

Johns, Geoff
Johns, Geoff
 
Johns, Geoff